The 2011 Nicky Rackard Cup is the seventh season of the Nicky Rackard Cup since its establishment in 2005.  A total of six teams will contest the Nicky Rackard Cup, including five sides from the 2010 Nicky Rackard Cup and one promoted team from the 2010 Lory Meagher Cup.  The teams are:
Fingal
Monaghan
London
Roscommon
Sligo
Louth

Structure
The tournament has a double elimination format - each team will play at least two games before being knocked out.
There are two Round 1 matches.
The winners in Round 1 advance to the Round 2.
The losers in Round 1 go into the quarter-finals.
There are two Round 2 matches.
The winners in Round 2 advance to the semifinals.
The losers in Round 2 go into the quarter finals.
There are two quarter-final matches between the Round 1 losers and Round 2 winners.
The winners of the quarter-finals advance to the semifinals.
The losers of the quarter-finals play a relegation playoff.
The losers of the relegation playoff are relegated to the Lory Meagher Cup for 2012.
There are two semifinal matches between the Round 2 winners and the quarter-final winners.
The winners of the semifinals advance to the final.
The losers of the semifinals are eliminated.
The winners of the final win the Nicky Rackard Cup for 2011 and are promoted to the Christy Ring Cup for 2012.

Fixtures

Round 1

Round 2

Quarter-finals

Semifinals

Final

Scoring

Widest winning margin: 25 points
London 6-20 - 1-10 Louth (Round 2)
Most goals in a match: 7
London 6-20 - 1-10 Louth (Round 2)
Most points in a match: 36
London 1-19 - 1-17 Roscommon (Round 1)
Most goals by one team in a match: 6
London 6-20 - 1-10 Louth (Round 2)
Most goals scored by a losing team: 2
Fingal 2-12 - 1-17 Monaghan (Round 2)
Most points scored by a losing team: 17
London 1-19 - 1-17 Roscommon (Round 1)

Nicky Rackard Cup
Nicky Rackard Cup